USS LST-929/LST(H)-929 was an  in the United States Navy. Like many of her class, she was not named and is properly referred to by her hull designation.

Construction
LST-929 was laid down on 5 June 1944, at Hingham, Massachusetts, by the Bethlehem-Hingham Shipyard; launched on 8 July 1944; and commissioned on 2 August 1944.

Service history
During World War II, LST-929 was assigned to the Asiatic-Pacific theater and participated in the assault and occupation of Iwo Jima in February 1945, and the assault and occupation of Okinawa Gunto from April through June 1945.

On 15 September 1945, she was redesignated LST(H)-929. Following the war, the ship performed occupation duty in the Far East and saw service in China until late May 1946. LST(H)-929 was decommissioned on 24 May 1946, and turned over to the Chinese Nationalist Navy. She was struck from the Navy list on 3 July 1946.

Awards
LST-929 earned two battle star for World War II service.

Notes

Citations

Bibliography 

Online resources

External links
 

 

LST-542-class tank landing ships
World War II amphibious warfare vessels of the United States
Ships built in Hingham, Massachusetts
1944 ships
Ships transferred from the United States Navy to the Republic of China Navy
LST-542-class tank landing ships of the Republic of China Navy